Neptunea ithia is a species of large sea snail or whelk, a marine gastropod mollusk in the family Buccinidae, the true whelks.

References

Buccinidae
Gastropods described in 1891